The Taipei Metro Qilian station (formerly transliterated as Chili An Station until 2003) is located in the Beitou District of Taipei, Taiwan. It is a station on the Tamsui Line (Red Line). In the past, the station belonged to the now-defunct TRA Tamsui Line.

Station overview

The two-level, elevated station structure with one island platform and one exit. The station is situated between Donghua Street and Xian Street, near the entrance of Gongguan. The washrooms are inside the entrance area.

History
The station was a station on the defunct TRA Tamsui Line. It was initially called "Chili An Station" as well, but was later renamed to "Shihpai Station". It was opened on 28 March 1997.

Station layout

References

1997 establishments in Taiwan
Railway stations opened in 1997
Tamsui–Xinyi line stations